

The Women's Teams open archery competition at the 2004 Summer Paralympics was held on 26 September at the Olympic Baseball Centre (Athens).

The event was won by the team representing .

Results

Ranking Round

Competition bracket

Team Lists

References

W
2004 in women's archery